French dressing, in consumer-facing American cuisine and store-bought products in the United States, is a creamy dressing that varies in color from pale orange to bright red. It is made of oil, vinegar, sugar, and other flavorings, with the coloring derived from tomato and often paprika. It exists on a spectrum between Russian and Catalina dressing.

In the nineteenth century, French dressing was synonymous with vinaigrette, which is still the definition used by the American professional culinary industry. Starting in the early twentieth century, American recipes for French dressing often added other flavorings to the vinaigrette, including Worcestershire sauce, onion juice, ketchup, sugar, and Tabasco sauce, but kept the name. By the 1920s, bottled French dressing was being sold as "Milani's 1890 French Dressing", but it is not clear whether it included ketchup at the time. The modern version is sweet and colored orange-to-red from the use of paprika and tomatoes. French dressing is generally pale orange and creamy, while Catalina French dressing is bright red and less creamy. On the Mississippi Gulf Coast, it is a common practice to dip pizza in Catalina French Dressing. 

Common brands of French dressing in the United States include Annie's, Bernstein's, Dorothy Lynch, Heinz, Ken's, Kraft, Newman's Own, Marzetti, Wish-Bone.

Regulation
In the United States, French dressing was regulated by federal standards. Between 1950 and 2022, the Food and Drug Administration (FDA) regulated French dressing to a standard with strict requirements of vegetable oil, vinegar, lemon or lime juice, salt, sugar, tomato paste or puree, and selected spices. On January 12, 2022, the FDA revoked the standard of identity and in the U.S. the ingredients can be at the choice of the manufacturer.

In Canada, the Food and Drug Regulations of the Foods and Drugs Act state that French dressing must be prepared using a combination of vegetable oil and vinegar or lemon juice and the final product must contain at least 35 percent vegetable oil.

See also
Russian dressing
Thousand Island dressing
Italian dressing

References

Salad dressings